Fábio Rocha Chiuffa (born 10 March 1989) is a Brazilian handball player who plays for HC Dobrogea Sud and the Brazilian handball team.

He won two gold medals at the Pan American Games and competed at the 2016 Olympics.

Individual awards and achievements
2016 Pan American Men's Handball Championship: Best right wing
2018 Pan American Men's Handball Championship: Best right wing, top scorer
2020 South and Central American Men's Handball Championship: Best right wing

References

External links

1989 births
Living people
Brazilian male handball players
Liga ASOBAL players
Handball players at the 2016 Summer Olympics
Pan American Games gold medalists for Brazil
Pan American Games silver medalists for Brazil
Pan American Games bronze medalists for Brazil
Handball players at the 2011 Pan American Games
Handball players at the 2015 Pan American Games
Handball players at the 2019 Pan American Games
Pan American Games medalists in handball
Olympic handball players of Brazil
Expatriate handball players
Brazilian expatriate sportspeople in Denmark
Brazilian expatriate sportspeople in Portugal
Brazilian expatriate sportspeople in Spain
Brazilian expatriate sportspeople in Romania
KIF Kolding players
South American Games gold medalists for Brazil
South American Games medalists in handball
Competitors at the 2018 South American Games
HC Dobrogea Sud Constanța players
Sporting CP handball players
Medalists at the 2015 Pan American Games
Medalists at the 2019 Pan American Games
Medalists at the 2011 Pan American Games
Handball players at the 2020 Summer Olympics
21st-century Brazilian people